Mr. Sunshine is an American sitcom that aired on ABC for one season in 1986.

The series followed the trials and tribulations of Paul Stark (played by Jeffrey Tambor), a blind university professor. Co-stars were Barbara Babcock and Leonard Frey.

The series was controversial during its run, attracting criticism from interest groups claiming that Mr. Sunshine poked fun at the visually impaired by using the lead character's disability as a focus for much of the show's humor. Supporters of the series said the show treated the character and the disability respectfully.

Cast
Jeffrey Tambor as Paul Stark
Nan Martin as Grace D'Angelo
Leonard Frey as Leon Walters
Cecilia Hart as Janice Hall
David Knell as Warren Leftwich
Barbara Babcock as June Swinford

Episodes

References

External links
 
 

1980s American college television series
1980s American sitcoms
1986 American television series debuts
1986 American television series endings
American Broadcasting Company original programming
English-language television shows
Television series by CBS Studios